Maina Kumari Bhandari (née Bista) (born October 1, 1958) is a Nepali communist politician and a member of the House of Representatives of the federal parliament of Nepal.

Personal life
She was born on October 1, 1958, in Juniya-7 of Gulmi, to Bhakta Bahadur and Chandra Kala Bista. She is educated up to the proficiency certification level. She was a schoolteacher for 25 years, before retiring in 2008.

Political career
She joined politics as a student in 1980, joining ANNFSU, the student wing of the then CPN ML, later CPN UML. As of 2013, she was the Lumbini "Incharge" of All Nepal Women Association, the women wing of CPN UML, as well as the central member of the party.

She was the CPN UML candidate for Gulmi-1 constituency in the 2008 as well as the 2013 constituent assembly elections.

In the 2017 legislative election, she was elected to parliament under the proportional representation system from CPN UML of the left alliance, now Nepal Communist Party (NCP), filling the reserved seat for women and Khas-Arya groups.

References

Living people
Communist Party of Nepal (Unified Marxist–Leninist) politicians
Nepal Communist Party (NCP) politicians
1958 births
People from Gulmi District
Nepalese schoolteachers
Khas people
Nepal MPs 2017–2022